USS LST-285 was a United States Navy  in commission from 1943 to 1947. She saw action in Europe during World War II.

Construction and commissioning
LST-285 was laid down on 16 August 1943 by the American Bridge Company at Ambridge, Pennsylvania. She was launched on 24 October 1943, sponsored by Mrs. R. A. Shaw, and commissioned on 13 December 1943.

World War II European Theater operations  
During World War II, LST-285 was assigned to the European Theater of Operations. She participated in the Operation Overlord, the invasion of Normandy in June 1944, and in Operation Dragoon, the invasion of southern France in August and September 1944.

Decommissioning and disposal
Upon her return to the United States, LST-285 was decommissioned on 27 June 1947 and stricken from the Navy List on 1 August 1947. On 26 March 1948, she was sold to the Kaiser Company, Inc., of Seattle, Washington, for scrapping.

Awards
LST-285 earned two battle stars for World War II service.

References 

NavSource Online: Amphibious Photo Archive - LST-285

See also 
 List of United States Navy LSTs

World War II amphibious warfare vessels of the United States
Ships built in Ambridge, Pennsylvania
1943 ships
LST-1-class tank landing ships of the United States Navy